Derakht-e Bid (also Romanized as Derakht-e Bīd) is a village in Bagh-e Keshmir Rural District, Salehabad County, Razavi Khorasan Province, Iran. At the 2006 census, its population was 400, in 82 families.

References 

Populated places in   Torbat-e Jam County